Osamu Abe may refer to:

, Japanese baseball player and coach
, Japanese rower